, known professionally as , is a Japanese DJ, songwriter, producer, and singer, known for his Vocaloid music.

Early life 
Takehiro Mamiya was born on September 25, 1989, when his parents were expecting a baby girl. He first learned to play the guitar in the sixth grade, by his father. First playing on piano and guitar in junior high school, he began to write music for club activities, and later performed on guitar and vocals in a band since high school.

Career 
In 2008, Yuyoyuppe began to post videos on the video sharing service Nico Nico Douga, where he would become well known for his Vocaloid songs with elements of hard rock, with considerable success for his song "Hope", sung by Hatsune Miku. He would later join the band My Eggplant Died Yesterday as a vocalist.

On September 26, 2012, Yuyoyuppe released his debut album Story of Hope, as his first release on the label Yamaha Music which he joined that year. On January 16, 2013, he released the album Wall in the Presence: Yuppemism Edition to the iTunes Store. On July 7, 2014, he released the album Vocaloholic, and later that month, he left My Eggplant Died Yesterday to form a new band called Grilled Meat Youngmans.

Yuyoyuppe has produced music for other artists, such as Babymetal, for their debut album Babymetal. He has since written music for the band, including the song "Karate" from Metal Resistance. Finding appeal in the band's music, he was approached by the band's manager Kobametal to write a song, to which he obliged.

Mamiya also performs as a DJ under the stage name DJ'Tekina//Something, having performed at the Rock in Japan Festival and Summer Sonic Festival.

Musical style 
His music follows the genres of rock and metal.

Mamiya has expressed that although he has solid scheduling and deadlines, he follows his instincts while working, which loosens his fixation on them. He has also stated that distributing his music digitally allows for audiences abroad to discover his work.

Discography

As Yuyoyuppe

As DJ'Tekina//Something

As Draw the Emotional

As Naked Identity Created By King

Productions 
Babymetal – Babymetal (2014)
 "Babymetal Death"
 "Megitsune"
 "Uki Uki ★ Midnight"
 "Rondo of Nightmare" (also lyricist and composer)

Momoiro Clover Z – Hakkin no Yoake (2016)
 ""Z" no Chikai"

Babymetal – Metal Resistance (2016)
 "Karate" (arranged as Yuppemetal; also lyricist and composer)
 "Yava!" (arranged as Yuppemetal)
 "From Dusk Till Dawn" (arranged as Yuppemetal)
 "GJ!" (arranged as Yuppemetal; also lyricist and composer)
 "Sis. Anger" (arranged as Yuppemetal)

Babymetal – Metal Galaxy (2019)
 "↑↓←→BBAB" (arranged as Yuppemetal)
 "Night Night Burn!" (arranged as Yuppemetal)
 "In the Name Of" (arranged as Yuppemetal)
 "Kagerou" (arranged as Yuppemetal; also composer)

Remixes 
As DJ'Tekina//Something
 Babymetal – "Headbangeeeeerrrrr!!!!!" (Night of 15 mix) (2013; from Kawa-EDM)
 Babymetal – "Megitsune" (Tekina Remix) (2013)

References 

1989 births
Living people
Japanese DJs
Musicians from Ibaraki Prefecture
21st-century Japanese singers
21st-century Japanese male singers
Vocaloid musicians